Hans Hansson (30 May 1919 – 14 November 2003) was a Swedish alpine skier who competed in the 1948 Winter Olympics.

In 1948 he finished sixth in the combined event, tenth in the downhill competition, and eleventh in the slalom event.

External links
 Alpine skiing 1948 

1919 births
2003 deaths
Swedish male alpine skiers
Alpine skiers at the 1948 Winter Olympics
Olympic alpine skiers of Sweden
People from Åre Municipality
Sportspeople from Jämtland County
20th-century Swedish people